The Free Movement was an American R&B vocal group formed in 1970 in Los Angeles, California, United States.

History
The band issued a hit single, "I've Found Someone of My Own", on Decca Records in 1971 which climbed to No. 5 in its 24th week on the Billboard Hot 100. The following year, the group signed to Columbia to release an album. They managed to chart a second single, but the group had no further success, despite reaching No. 7 on the Easy Listening Chart. The Columbia LP contained both single releases.

Members
Godoy Colbert (formerly of Pilgrim Travelers and The Pharaohs)
Josephine Brown (formerly of Five Bells of Joy)
Cheryl Conley
Jennifer Gates
Adrian Jefferson
Claude Jefferson

Discography

Albums

Singles

References

Musical groups from Los Angeles
Decca Records artists
Columbia Records artists